
Gauge is an American pornographic actress and feature dancer.

Career
After having appeared in about 140 movies, Gauge left the pornographic film industry in 2005 due to a contract dispute with her management company. She was certified as a surgical technologist, but she reported that she was often turned down for jobs because of her adult film career. She retrained as a makeup artist, but suffered similar issues.

While Gauge was studying to become a surgical technician, an anesthesia student recognized Gauge from her adult film career, word quickly spread through the hospital staff that there was a porn star among their ranks, and, when Gauge was set to graduate, she said that no one at the unnamed hospital would sign off on her required hours. Gauge has also claimed that while "working at a hospital" that her "boss hit on her", and she was unable to convince the hospital's complaints department that the incident happened, so she ended up giving her notice.

Awards and nominations

References

External links

 
 
 
 

Year of birth missing (living people)
American pornographic film actresses
Living people
21st-century American actresses